Odyssey (also known as The Odyssey or The Odyssey Online) is an American internet media company that operates based on a crowdsourced model, receiving articles from a base of thousands of volunteer authors and edited through their teams of volunteer, outsourced, and professional content strategists. The platform produces material covering virtually all major topics, including politics, sports, fashion, technology, entertainment, business, science, and health, among others. Odyssey has over 15,000 contributing writers, 1,200 communities, and over 30 million readers across the country. Each community consists of at least 12 writers, a voluntary editor-in-chief, and a content strategist based in the New York City headquarters. Within each team are opportunities for executive positions, like a contributing editor, social outreach specialist, recruitment director, and more, all on a voluntary basis. Writers have the opportunity to receive compensation for their articles based on the number of page views a contributor generates.

Odyssey was co-founded by Evan Burns and Adrian France, two students from Indiana University, in 2014 under the Odyssey Media Group, Inc. The platform's users consist mostly of university and college students in the age range of 18-28, and its viewers mostly come from each individual user's social media networks, such as Facebook and Twitter.

History

Origins 
In 2010, Evan Burns and Adrian France co-founded Odyssey Media Group, Inc. It started as a print publication, called The Odyssey, at Indiana University with a focus on Greek life and campus issues not generally covered by the university’s official news publication.

Odyssey expanded its print publication to include Greek chapters at other universities, including San Diego State University, the University of South Carolina, the University of Arkansas, and the University of Alabama.

Online transition and funding 
In 2014, Odyssey was launched as an online publication and platform. In 2015 and early 2016, Odyssey received funding from various sources, totaling over $33 million.

In February 2017, Odyssey laid off 53 employees, a third of its staff. Evan Burns, the former CEO, was relieved of most major financial and management duties and was given the title executive chairman.

Business overview 
Odyssey's users are required to apply to start writing articles; the requirements for these authors include having a "unique perspective" and the ability to submit one piece per week.

Odyssey's writers are divided into communities, most of which are college and middle school campuses, though users are not required to attend as a student at those campuses. Instead, users who do not attend a college or university can write for the community which is located nearest to them. Once a user has been approved, they can start posting content on the platform. Most pieces of content are reviewed in a three-tiered editing system, starting with volunteer editors, then moving on to an outsourced set of freelance copy editors, and finally back to a set of paid content strategists, employed by Odyssey.

While users are not regularly paid, incentives for highly-viewed articles are given. Writers have the opportunity to receive compensation for their articles based on the number of page view a contributor generates.

References 

Online mass media companies of the United States
Publications established in 2010
Internet properties established in 2014
American social networking websites